Wine, Women and Horses is a 1937 American drama film directed by Louis King and written by Roy Chanslor. The film stars Barton MacLane, Ann Sheridan, Dick Purcell, Peggy Bates, Walter Cassel and Lottie Williams. It is based on the 1933 novel Dark Hazard by W. R. Burnett. The film was released by Warner Bros. on September 11, 1937. The screenplay concerns a gambler who tries to reform.

Plot
His gal pal Valerie buys compulsive gambler Jim Turner a meal after he goes broke. Jim takes off for points unknown and, stopping in a small Midwest town, he wins $20 off of George Mayhew in a game of horseshoes, then returns the money when he learns George can't afford to lose it. Jim rents a room from the Mayhews who run a boarding house and takes a liking to George's sister, Marjorie. The feeling is mutual, despite Marjorie's reservations about Jim's life as a gambler. She spurns her beau Pres to marry Jim. Jim promises to get a job and does, as a Chicago hotel's night manager. Becoming disgruntled with his boss, Jim goes out early Christmas morning and wins $3,000 gambling. A hotel guest, Bright, notices Jim's success and offers him a job looking after his racehorses in California. Jim accepts and, promising Marjorie his gambling days are over, they move to California.

Though not gambling, Jim spends his time at the track cheering on Bright's mare, Lady Luck. Jim runs into Valerie while he and Marjorie are at the track, and the two ladies are introduced. Marjorie becomes upset after Jim tells her Valerie gave him some of her winnings and she retires for the evening. Jim leaves with Valerie and her escort, Broadway Willis, and the three go out with Jim winning $20,000 gambling. However, Marjorie leaves Jim a note telling him she can't live with him anymore, she is pregnant; and, she is returning home. Marjorie re-connects with Pres.

Jim returns to the Mayhew house and is told by George that Jim's and Marjorie's baby boy died.  Marjorie intercepts Jim as he leaves and discovers he is in one of his "down" periods as a gambler and headed east. Jim promises to quit gambling and get a job. Working at a cigar store, he runs in to George who has now become a professional gambler working at the local track. George tells Jim the mare, Lady Luck, is racing there. The horse injures its leg, throwing its rider. Jim buys the horse to prevent it from being destroyed. Jim rehabilitates Lady Luck, but is fired from his job at the cigar store. Jim realizes his lifestyle will never make him a good husband; that Marjorie yearns for the stability Pres can give her; and, he leaves. Jim returns to his gambling ways and reunites with Valerie.

Cast         
 Barton MacLane as Jim Turner
 Ann Sheridan as Valerie
 Dick Purcell as George Mayhew
 Peggy Bates as Marjorie Mayhew
 Walter Cassel as Pres. Barrow
 Lottie Williams as Mrs. Mayhew
 Kenneth Harlan as Bright
 Charley Foy as Broadway Willis
 Eugene Jackson as Eight Ball
 Archie Robbins as Joe

References

External links 
 
 
 
 

1937 films
1937 drama films
American black-and-white films
American drama films
Films based on American novels
Films based on works by W. R. Burnett
Films directed by Louis King
Films about gambling
American horse racing films
Warner Bros. films
1930s English-language films
1930s American films